Charles Drew (24 April 1888 – 19 February 1960) was an Australian cricketer. He played one first-class match for South Australia in 1925/26.

See also
 List of South Australian representative cricketers

References

External links
 

1888 births
1960 deaths
Australian cricketers
South Australia cricketers
Cricketers from Adelaide